Ulysses and the Sirens may refer to:

 Ulysses and the Sirens (Waterhouse), an 1891 painting by John William Waterhouse
 Ulysses and the Sirens (Draper), a 1909 painting by Herbert James Draper